TBK1 (TANK-binding kinase 1) is an enzyme with kinase activity. Specifically, it is a serine / threonine protein kinase. It is encoded by the TBK1 gene in humans. This kinase is mainly known for its role in innate immunity antiviral response. However, TBK1 also regulates cell proliferation, apoptosis, autophagy, and anti-tumor immunity. Insufficient regulation of TBK1 activity leads to autoimmune, neurodegenerative diseases or tumorigenesis.

Structure and regulation of activity 
TBK1 is a non-canonical IKK kinase that phosphorylates the nuclear factor kB (NFkB). It shares sequence homology with canonical IKK.

The N-terminus of the protein contains the kinase domain (region 9-309) and the ubiquitin-like domain (region 310-385). The C-terminus is formed by two coiled-coil structures (region 407-713) that provide a surface for homodimerization.

The autophosphorylation of serine 172, which requires homodimerization and ubiquitinylation of lysines 30 and 401, is necessary for kinase activity.

Involvement in signaling pathways 
TBK1 is involved in many signaling pathways and forms a node between them. For this reason, regulation of its involvement in individual signaling pathways is necessary. This is provided by adaptor proteins that interact with the dimerization domain of TBK1 to determine its location and access to substrates. Binding to TANK leads to localization to the perinuclear region and phosphorylation of substrates which is required for subsequent production of type I interferons (IFN-I). In contrast, binding to NAP1 and SINTBAD leads to localization in the cytoplasm and involvement in autophagy. Another adaptor protein that determines the location of TBK1 is TAPE. TAPE targets TBK1 to endolysosomes.

A key interest in TBK1 is due to its role in innate immunity, especially in antiviral responses. TBK1 is redundant with IKK, but TBK1 seems to play a more important role. After triggering antiviral signaling through PRRs (pattern recognition receptors), TBK1 is activated. Subsequently, it phosphorylates the transcription factor IRF3, which is translocated to the nucleus, and promotes production of IFN-I.

As a non-canonical IKK, TBK1 is also involved in the non-canonical NFkB pathway. It phosphorylates p100/NF-κB2, which is subsequently processed in the proteasome and released as a p52 subunit. This subunit dimerizes with RelB and mediates gene expression.

In the canonical NFkB pathway, the NF-kappa-B (NFKB) complex of proteins is inhibited by I-kappa-B (IKB) proteins, which inactivate NFKB by trapping it in the cytoplasm. Phosphorylation of serine residues on the IKB proteins by IKB kinases marks them for destruction via the ubiquitination pathway, thereby allowing activation and nuclear translocation of the NFKB complex. The protein encoded by this gene is similar to IKB kinases and can mediate NFkB activation in response to certain growth factors.

TBK1 promotes autophagy involved in pathogen and mitochondrial clearance. TBK1 phosphorylates autophagy receptors  and components of the autophagy apparatus. Furthermore, TBK1 is also involved in the regulation of cell proliferation, apoptosis and glucose metabolism.

Interactions 
TANK-binding kinase 1 has been shown to interact with:

 NCK1,
 TANK,
 TRAF2 and
 TBKBP1 aka SINTBAD

Transcription factors activated upon TBK1 activation include IRF3, IRF7 and ZEB1.

Clinical significance 
Deregulation of TBK1 activity and mutations in this protein are associated with many diseases. Due to the role of TBK1 in cell survival, deregulation of its activity is associated with tumorogenesis. There are also many autoimmune (e.g., rheumatoid arthritis, sympathetic lupus), neurodegenerative (e.g., amyotrophic lateral sclerosis), and infantile (e.g., herpesviral encephalitis) diseases.

The loss of TBK1 cause embryonic lethality in mice.

Inhibition of IκB kinase (IKK) and  IKK-related kinases, IKBKE (IKKε) and TANK-binding kinase 1 (TBK1), has been investigated as a therapeutic option for the treatment of inflammatory diseases and cancer, and a way to overcome resistance to cancer immunotherapy.

See also 
 CGAS–STING cytosolic DNA sensing pathway

References

Further reading 

 
 
 
 
 
 
 
 
 
 
 
 
 
 
 
 

EC 2.7.11